ۀ is the  fortieth letter of Pashto alphabet and a form of hāʾ with a hamza above. It represents the vowel  and is transliterated . It is known as Kajira He. When used in certain Persian dialects, it makes the eje sound

In written Pashto, it only appears in the final position:

References

Pashto